The Eastern Association of Women's Rowing Colleges (EAWRC) is a college athletic conference of eighteen women's college rowing crew teams. The conference is an affiliate of the Eastern College Athletic Conference (ECAC).

Members
See footnote

Boston College
Boston University
Brown University
Columbia University
Cornell University
Dartmouth College
Georgetown University
George Washington University
Massachusetts Institute of Technology

Northeastern University
University of Pennsylvania
Princeton University
Radcliffe (Harvard)
Rutgers University
Syracuse University
United States Naval Academy
University of Wisconsin–Madison
Yale University

Championship

See also
Eastern Association of Rowing Colleges (men)

Footnotes

External links
Eastern Association of Women's Rowing Colleges (EAWRC) home page (Eastern College Athletic Conference official website). Retrieved 2010-02-28.

 
Women's sports organizations in the United States